These are the squads of the 1980 Mundialito tournament that was played between 30 December 1980 and 10 January 1981, in Uruguay.

Argentina

Head coach: Cesar Luis Menotti

Brazil

Head coach: Telê Santana

Italy
Head coach: Enzo Bearzot

Netherlands
Head coach: Jan Zwartkruis

Uruguay
Head coach: Roque Máspoli

West Germany
Head coach: Jupp Derwall

Squads
Association football tournament squads